The Wanyan (Manchu:  Wanggiyan;) clan was among the clans of the Heishui Mohe tribe living in the drainage region of the Heilong River during the time of the Khitan-led Liao dynasty. Of the Heishui Mohe, the clan was counted by the Liao dynasty among the "uncivilized Jurchens" (生女真) indicating that the clan was not subject to the direct rule of the Liao emperors. Those Heishui Mohe clans ruled by the Liao dynasty were referred to as "civilized Jurchens" (熟女真). The Wanyan clan later founded the Jin dynasty.

Origins
The origins of the clan are obscure. According to sources such as the History of Jin (Jinshi 金史) and the Research on the Origin of the Manchus (Manzhou yuanliu kao 滿洲源流考), the clan's progenitor Hanpu emigrated from the kingdom of Goryeo or Silla at the age of sixty and married a sixty-year-old local woman who bore him three children. However, controversy exists as to the ethno-cultural identity of Hanpu, and the factual validity of the story itself. 

However Wanyan Yingge initiated an invasion of the Korean peninsula and Yingge's paternal nephew Wanyan Wuyashu fought against the Koreans, forcing them to submit and recognize Jurchens as overlords after "pacifying" the border between the Koreans and Jurchens. Yingge died during the conquest of Helandian (曷懶甸; present-day Hamgyong Province, North Korea) after pacifying the Tumen River basin. Wuyashu resumed the project in the next year. Under his order, Shishihuan (石適歡) led a Wanyan army from the Tumen River basin to subdue rival Jurchen tribes in Helandian and advance southward to chase about 1,800 remnants who defected to the Korean kingdom Goryeo. Goryeo did not hand them over but sent Im Gan (林幹) to intercept the Wanyan army. However, Shishihuan defeated Im Gan north of the Chŏngp'ŏyng wall and invaded northeastern frontier of Goryeo. Goryeo dispatched Yun Gwan to resist the Jurchens but lost in battle again. As a result, Wuyashu subjugated the Jurchens in Helandian.

In 1107, Goryeo sent a delegate, Heihuanfangshi (黑歡方石), to celebrate Wuyashu's accession to the chieftainship of the Wanyan tribe, and promised to return those Helandian Jurchens who escaped to Goryeo. However, when Wuyashu's delegates, Aguo (阿聒) and Wulinda Shengkun (烏林答勝昆), arrived in Goryeo, the Koreans killed them and dispatched five large armies led by Yun Gwan to attack Helandian. The Goryeo army destroyed a hundred Jurchen villages and built nine fortresses there. Wuyashu thought about giving up Helandian, but his brother Aguda convinced him to dispatch Wosai (斡賽), another of their brothers, to fight Goryeo. Wosai also built nine fortresses facing Goryeo's nine fortresses. After a one-year battle, the Wanyan army won two fortresses but they suffered heavy losses and seven other fortresses were still held by the Goryeo forces. Jurchens offered a truce to Goryeo and Goryeo and the Jurchens achieved a settlement. As a result, Jurchens swore not to invade Goryeo and Goryeo withdrew from the nine fortresses.

Wuyashu also pacified the Suifen River basin.

Founding of the Jurchen-led Jin dynasty

In 1115 AD, Wanyan Aguda, the chieftain of the Wanyan clan at the time, founded the Jin dynasty. Before his death in 1123, he also ended the Liao dynasty. Two years later, his brother Wanyan Wuqimai invaded the Song dynasty and conquered northern China in the Jin–Song Wars. Thereafter the Jurchens became sinicized; this can be seen in the sinicization of the surname "Wanyan" to "Wang" in the official Jurchen historical records.

Downfall and in the modern day
The Jin dynasty was destroyed in 1234 AD. After their victory, Mongol declared that people with the surname "Wanyan" were considered to be related to the royal line of the Jin dynasty, and therefore such individuals were to be executed immediately. For the sake of survival, those people with the surname "Wanyan" either changed the name to Wang or moved to a remote area to avoid capture and execution and used the Manchu format Wanggiyan. In present-day China, few descendants have kept the surname "Wanyan."

Notable figures

Males
Aguda 1115–1123,founder of Jin dynasty 
Wuqimai 1123–1135,emperor Taizong of Jin 
Dan 1135–1149,emperor Xizong of Jin 
Liang 1149–1161, fourth emperor of the Jurchen-led Jin dynasty
Yong 1161–1189, Emperor Shizong of Jin
Jing 1189–1208 Emperor Zhangzong of Jin
Yungong,Emperor Shizong's second son and heir apparent
Xun 1213–1224,Emperor Xuanzong of Jin 
Shouxu, Emperor Aizong of Jin
Chenglin,Emperor Mo of Jin
Xongbi,military general and civil minister of the Jurchen-led Jin dynasty, also known as Wushu
Yongji
Heda
Chenheshang
Zhanhan
Hafeng'a (哈丰阿), held a title of master commandant of light chariot (轻车都尉, pinyin: qingcheduwei)
Qing'en (庆恩), served as sixth rank literary official
 Prince Consort

Females
Imperial Consort
 Consort
 Consort Shu (b. 1772), the Jiaqing Emperor's secondary consort
 Consort Zhuang (1781–1811), the Jiaqing Emperor's consort

 Imperial Concubine
 Imperial Concubine Jing, the Kangxi Emperor's imperial concubine

Princess Consort
 Primary Consort
 Yunti's primary consort, the mother of Hongming (1705–1767) and Hongkai (1707–1759)

 Secondary Consort
 Yunreng's secondary consort, the mother of Hongtiao (1714–1774) and Hongbing (1720–1763)
 Yongzhang's secondary consort, the mother of first son (1756)
 Yongcheng's secondary consort, the mother of Mianhui (1764–1796), second son (1766), third son (1767–1769), Princess (1769–1787), fourth son (1771) and Princess (b. 1776)
 Yicong's secondary consort, the mother of Zaijin (1859–1896)

 Concubine
 Yunzhi's concubine, the mother of Hongyi (1715–1754)
 Yuntang's concubine, the mother of first daughter (1701–1725), Lady (1704–1727) and Hongding (1711–1782)

See also
 Category:Wanyan family – Wanyan family members 
 List of Manchu clans
 Plain White Banner

References
Visiting the Wanyan Village in Jingchuan, Gansu Province (in Chinese language)

Manchu clans
Jurchen history
Khitan history
Surnames
Chinese clans
Individual Chinese surnames